Aristidis Grigorakis (born 12 December 1962) is a Greek wrestler. He competed in the men's Greco-Roman 68 kg at the 1988 Summer Olympics.

References

External links
 

1962 births
Living people
Greek male sport wrestlers
Olympic wrestlers of Greece
Wrestlers at the 1988 Summer Olympics
Place of birth missing (living people)
20th-century Greek people